is a former Japanese football player. His brother Hiroto Yamamoto is also a footballer.

Club statistics

References

External links

1986 births
Living people
Association football people from Ibaraki Prefecture
Japanese footballers
J1 League players
J2 League players
Japan Football League players
Kashima Antlers players
Thespakusatsu Gunma players
Gainare Tottori players
Association football defenders